Iranian football's 2nd division is the third-highest football division overall in the Iranian football league system. Before 2001, the 2nd division league was the second-highest division in Iranian football league system, however, this was changed to third-highest division when Iran's football structure officially became professional.

The league consists of two, fourteen team groups who play each other twice in a home and away format. The first and second placed teams in each group are automatically promoted to the Azadegan League. The bottom two teams in both groups are automatically relegated to the 3rd division.

If teams in the promotion or relegation spots are tied in terms of points, a home and away series will be played. The team with the best aggregate score will either avoid relegation or win promotion.

Sometimes these rules are not followed exactly. For example in the 2005–06 season, Deihim Ahvaz should have been relegated, but Nozhan Mazandaran despite finishing ahead of Deihim, were relegated instead because of the club's poor financial situation. Additionally the number of teams in each group was increased from twelve to fourteen this season.

Format
 12 clubs: 2002–2003
 24 clubs: 2003–2004
 20 clubs: 2004–2005
 24 clubs: 2005–2006
 28 clubs: 2006–2008
 36 clubs: 2008–2010
 32 clubs: 2010–2011
 28 clubs: 2011–2014
 40 clubs: 2014–2016
 37 clubs: 2016–2017
 33 clubs: 2017–2018
 26 clubs: 2018–2019

League champions

As Iran's second-highest football division, 1972–1979
1972–73: Taj Ahvaz
1973–74: Sepahan
1974–75: Tractor
1975–76: Machine Sazi
1976–77: Rah Ahan
1977–78: Aboomoslem
1978–79:  did not finish

As Iran's second-highest football division, 1990–2001
1990–91: Malavan (A), Aboomoslem (B),  Taam Esfehan (C), Esteghlal Ahvaz (D)
1991–92: Bargh Shiraz
1992–93: Chooka Anzali
1993–94: Naft Ghaemshahr
1994–95: Bahman Karaj
1995–96: Payam Mashhad (A) and Sanat Naft Abadan (B)
1996–97: Fajr Sepasi
1997–98: Malavan
1998–99: Bahman Karaj
1999–00: Bargh Shiraz
2000–01: Aboomoslem

As Iran's third-highest football division, 2001—Present
2001–02: Unknown
2002–03: Shahid Ghandi
2003–04: Sanati Kaveh (National Group) and Pasargad Tehran (Region Groups/North) and Deyhim Ahvaz (Region Groups/South)
2004–05: Shahrdari Langarudn  (A) and Pegah Khozestan (B)
2005–06: Pegah Tehran (A) and Etka Gorgan (B)
2006–07: Sepahan Novin (A) and Bargh Tehran (B)
2007–08: Aluminium Hormozgan
2008–09: Sanati Kaveh (A) and Mes Sarcheshmeh (B)
2009–10: Sepidrood Rasht
2010–11: Esteghlal Jonub
2011–12: Esteghlal Ahvaz
2012–13: Naft Gachsaran (A) and Siah Jamegan (B)
2013–14: Shahrdari Ardabil (A) and Etka Gorgan (B)
2014–15: Aluminium Arak
2015–16: Oxin Alborz (A) and Sepidrood Rasht (B)
2016–17: Shahrdari Tabriz (A) and Shahrdari Mahshahr (B)
2017–18: Karoon Arvand Khorramshahr (A) and Shahin Bushehr (B)
2018–19: Khooshe Talaee
2019–20: Chooka Talesh
2020–21: Mes Shahr-e Babak
2021–22: Chooka Talesh

See also
 IPL
 Azadegan League
 Iran Football's 3rd Division
 Iranian Super Cup
 Hazfi Cup
 Iranian Futsal Super League
 Iran Futsal's 1st Division
 Iran Futsal's 2nd Division

References

External links
 League 2 Iran | Results, Fixtures, Standings, Players ...
 Unofficial Fans Site

 
3
Third level football leagues in Asia
Sports leagues established in 1972
1972 establishments in Iran
Professional sports leagues in Iran